Jane Inglis Clark (1859/1860–1950) was a Scottish mountaineer and rock climber. She co-founded the Ladies' Scottish Climbing Club with Lucy Smith and Mabel Clark in 1908.

Life
Inglis Clark was born Jane Isabella Shannon to Isabella Struthers Wilson and David Shannon, a tea planter. In 1884 she married William Inglis Clark and they had two children, Mabel Clark (1885-1967) and Charles Clark (1888-1918).

During the First World War, Inglis Clark was a Voluntary Aid Detachment Commandant for the Red Cross. From 1919-1938 she was a parish and county councillor in Edinburgh, where she also served as a Justice of the Peace.

Mountaineering
Inglis Clark was a keen hillwalker who discovered rock climbing in 1897. With a natural aptitude for climbing difficult routes, from 1897 to 1904, Inglis Clark was part of six first ascents on Ben Nevis. She was proud to be a pioneer and was keen to encourage other women to take up mountaineering.

Since women were not allowed to join the all-male Scottish Mountaineering Club, Inglis Clark, together with Lucy Smith and her daughter Mabel founded the Ladies Scottish Climbing Club in 1908. The Club's purpose was "to bring together Ladies who are lovers of mountain-climbing, and to encourage mountaineering in Scotland, in winter as well as in summer."

Inglis Clark wrote about her mountaineering experiences in her book Pictures and Memories, published in 1938, which also commemorates women’s increased participation in climbing.

Charles Inglis Clark Memorial Hut
As a memorial of their son, a keen mountaineer who was killed in the First World War, Jane and William Inglis Clark funded the Charles Inglis Clark Memorial Hut on Ben Nevis, which opened in 1929. Archive footage shows mountaineers gathering on Ben Nevis for the opening ceremony.

References

Bibliography
 

19th-century births
1950 deaths
Year of birth uncertain
People associated with Edinburgh
Scottish mountain climbers
Female climbers
Scottish women activists
Scottish justices of the peace
British women's rights activists